1969 is an album by Julie Driscoll.

Track listing
All tracks composed by Julie Driscoll

Side one
"A New Awakening"
"Those That We Love"
"Leaving It All Behind"
"Break-Out"

Side two
"The Choice"
"Lullaby"
"Walk Down"
"I Nearly Forgot – But I Went Back"

Personnel
Julie Driscoll - vocals, acoustic guitars
Chris Spedding - guitars, bass
Keith Tippett - piano, celeste, arrangements
Elton Dean - alto saxophone
Nick Evans - trombone
Brian Godding - electric guitar, voices
Trevor Tomkins - drums
Derek Wadsworth - trombone
Jeff Clyne - bass, arco bass
Mark Charig - cornet
Karl Jenkins - oboe
Bud Parkes - trumpet
Stan Sulzmann - alto saxophone
Brian Belshaw - bass guitar, voices
Jim Cregan - guitar
Barry Reeves - drums
Bob Downes - flute

Production
Produced by Giorgio Gomelsky
Recorded at Advision Studios, London, England, 1969
Engineer : Eddie Offord
Grahame Berney, Keith Davis, Oliver Wade - art direction and design

References

1971 albums
Julie Driscoll albums
Albums produced by Giorgio Gomelsky
Polydor Records albums
Albums arranged by Keith Tippett